The Sells Floto Circus was a combination of the Floto Dog & Pony Show and the Sells Brothers Circus that toured with sideshow acts in the United States and Canada during the early 1900s.

History
Frederick Gilmer Bonfils and Harry Heye Tammen owned the first outfit as well as the Denver Post, and the "Floto" name came from the Post's one-time sportswriter, Otto Floto. During the 1914–1915 seasons the circus featured Buffalo Bill Cody.

The Sells Floto circus absorbed Buffalo Bill's Wild West shows, and  the Sells Brothers Circus, it was also a "combined" show. It later became the concessions department of Ringling Brothers Circus, along with Haggenback Wallace, who made the floats and other equipment.

The circus had four elephant births, three born to "Alice" and one to "Mama Mary". The sire of all four was "Snyder". None survived longer than five months.

By 1929 the Sells Floto Circus was part of the American Circus Corporation which consisted of Hagenbeck-Wallace Circus, the John Robinson Circus, the Sparks Circus, and the Al G. Barnes Circus.  John Nicholas Ringling then bought American Circus Corporation for $1.7-million creating a monopoly of traveling circus in America.

On April 17, 1908 the Sells-Floto circus appeared in Riverside CA and while the animals were ushered off of the train a vapor flashback explosion occurred at the adjacent oil storage tank which frightened the animals.  There was an elephant stampede into downtown Riverside with 1 dead and 6 injured.

Feld Entertainment later used the Sells-Floto name for their supply division, located in Laurel, MD, that provided logistical support for all of the Feld shows for supplies and merchandise, including not only the three units of Ringling Bros. and Barnum & Bailey, but the numerous On Ice shows (Disney On Ice, Ice Follies, etc.).   This unit has since been renamed Feld Consumer Products.

Alternate names
 Sells-Floto Circus, Harry Tammen and Fred Bonfils, proprietors
 Sells-Floto Circus & Buffalo Bill's Wild West
 Sells-Floto Circus, John Ringling, proprietor
 Sells-Floto Circus & Buffalo Bill's Wild West
 Sells-Floto Circus, American Circus Corp., proprietor

Members
 Novelist and cookbook author Isabel Moore's "first career" was as a trapeze artist with Sells Floto ca. 1928. She took the job because she had "courage, but no brains."
 Pasqual Piñón, (1889–1929), known as "The Two-Headed Mexican", was a performer with the Sells-Floto Circus in the early 1900s.
 In 1919, professional boxer Georges Carpentier exhibited his boxing skills with the Sells Floto Circus for ten weeks at the rate of $2,000 a week.

Gallery

References

External links

Circuses
Ringling Bros. and Barnum & Bailey Circus
1929 disestablishments in the United States